Gabriel Lake is a forest freshwater body in the southeastern part of the Eeyou Istchee James Bay (municipality), in Jamésie, in the administrative region of Nord-du-Québec, in the province of Quebec, in Canada.

This body of water extends in the townships of Rohault, Robert and Crisafy. Forestry is the main economic activity of the sector. Recreational tourism activities come second.

The watershed of Lake Gabriel is accessible via the R1032 forest road (North-South direction) which passes on the west side of the lake. The surface of Lake Gabriel is usually frozen from early November to mid-May, however, safe ice circulation is generally from mid-November to mid-April.

Geography

Toponymy
The term "Gabriel" is a name of French origin.

The toponym "lac Gabriel" was formalized on December 5, 1968, by the Commission de toponymie du Québec, when it was created.

Notes and references

See also 

Eeyou Istchee James Bay
Lakes of Nord-du-Québec
Nottaway River drainage basin